Spectrolab is a manufacturer of space solar cells and panels headquartered in Sylmar, California.  It is a subsidiary of The Boeing Company, and part of Boeing Defense, Space & Security. Spectrolab was founded in 1956 by Alfred E. Mann, a billionaire American entrepreneur and philanthropist. Spectrolab  was originally a division of Textron. Spectrolab was acquired by Hughes Aircraft Company in 1975 and became a subsidiary of Hughes until its sale to Boeing in 2000.

The company states its "NeXt Triple Junction" high efficiency solar cells have a minimum average efficiency of 29.5% to AIAA-2005-111 and AIAA-2005-112 requirements. In 2006 testing at the National Renewable Energy Laboratory demonstrated an efficiency of 40.7% using triple-junction solar cells developed by Spectrolab under concentration.

In 2013, testing at the National Renewable Energy Laboratory demonstrated an efficiency of 38.7% without concentration, a new world record at the time.

Spectrolab claims to have manufactured over 4 million space qualified multi-junction solar cells or solar panels to the industry as of 2013.

Spectrolab has recently geared its highly efficient space solar cell technology for terrestrial purposes with great success using concentrators.  Spectrolab's terrestrial concentrating cell boasts greater than 30% AM1.5D min. avg. efficiency from 200 to 400 Suns concentration in production.

Solar Cells
The company's ultra triple junction solar cells use exotic materials like germanium, InGaP2, and gallium arsenide to achieve their efficiency.

References

External links
 http://www.spectrolab.com

Boeing mergers and acquisitions
Sylmar, Los Angeles
Solar energy companies of the United States
Manufacturing companies established in 1956
Manufacturing companies based in Los Angeles
1975 mergers and acquisitions
2000 mergers and acquisitions